Lyra Catherine McKee ( 31 March 1990 – 18 April 2019) was a journalist from Northern Ireland who wrote for several publications about the consequences of the Troubles. She also served as an editor for Mediagazer, a news aggregator website. On 18 April 2019, McKee was fatally shot during rioting in the Creggan area of Derry.

Early life and education
McKee was born on 31 March 1990 in Belfast, Northern Ireland. Her interest in journalism began at fourteen years old when she wrote for the school newspaper at St Gemma's High School. By the following year she joined Children's Express (shortly to be renamed Headliners), a charity that supports young people through helping them develop journalism skills, and through that was awarded the Young Journalist Award by Sky News in 2006. She studied online journalism at Birmingham City University under Paul Bradshaw, pursuing an Master of Arts degree, but did not graduate. She was posthumously awarded an MA in online journalism in January 2020; her sister, Nichola Corner, accepted the degree on her behalf.

Career
In 2011, McKee joined the staff of news aggregator Mediagazer, a sister site of technology news aggregator Techmeme. In 2014, she came to wider public attention with the publication of a blog post titled "Letter to my 14-year-old self" in which she described the challenges of growing up gay in Belfast; it was subsequently made into a short film. McKee's work as a journalist included a number of pieces that appeared in both domestic and international media. Among these were articles she wrote for Mosaic (republished by The Atlantic), The Belfast Telegraph, Private Eye and BuzzFeed News. In 2016 Forbes magazine named her as one of its "30 under 30 in media" because of her work as an investigative reporter.

Publication of her first book, a non-fiction work titled Angels with Blue Faces, was imminent at the time of her death. It deals with the Provisional IRA killing of Belfast MP Robert Bradford. McKee sought crowdfunding to finance its publication, and it was scheduled for publication by Excalibur Press. She subsequently signed a two-book deal with Faber and Faber. At the time of her death, her second book, The Lost Boys, was scheduled for release by Faber in 2020, but remained unfinished. It concerns the disappearances of Thomas Spence and John Rodgers from Belfast's Falls Road in November 1974. Faber and Faber had compared the work to that of Anna Funder's Stasiland and Andy O'Hagan's The Missing.

McKee wrote on the consequences of The Troubles. She notably wrote "Suicide of the Ceasefire Babies", an article on teenage suicides linked to the conflict. At the time of her death, McKee was researching unsolved killings during The Troubles in Northern Ireland of the late 20th century. In March 2019 Irish Times writer Martin Doyle featured McKee in his article "Best of Irish: 10 rising stars of Irish writing".

She gave a TEDx talk, "How uncomfortable conversations can save lives", at TEDxStormont Women in 2017, about the 2016 Orlando nightclub shooting. In 2018, she became a trustee of Headliners, the charity that had helped her as a teenager to start her career in journalism.

McKee was the partner of Sara Canning, a nurse at Altnagelvin Area Hospital, and had moved to Derry to be with her. After her death it was revealed that she had been planning to propose marriage to Canning, and had purchased an engagement ring.

Death 

On 18 April 2019, McKee was shot during rioting in the Creggan area of Derry, Northern Ireland. Violence broke out after police raids on dissidents with the aim of seizing munitions ahead of the Easter Rising commemorative parades due to take place in the area that weekend. The disturbances were centred on Fanad Drive. Youths threw petrol bombs and burnt two vehicles. Police said that a gunman then fired up to twelve shots towards police officers. McKee, who was on Fanad Drive and standing near an armoured police Land Rover, was wounded in the head. Mobile phone footage and police CCTV footage shows a masked gunman, believed to be a member of the New IRA, opening fire with a handgun. McKee was taken by police, in an armoured Land Rover, to Altnagelvin Area Hospital, where she later died. Police blamed dissident republicans for her death. The last time a journalist was killed in the UK was the 2001 assassination of Martin O'Hagan.

She was survived by her partner, mother, two brothers and three sisters.

Funeral and vigils
McKee's funeral took place at the Anglican St Anne's Cathedral, Belfast, on 24 April. It was attended by British Prime Minister Theresa May, Irish President Michael D. Higgins, Taoiseach Leo Varadkar, DUP leader Arlene Foster, Sinn Féin leader Mary Lou McDonald and Sinn Féin Vice President Michelle O'Neill, and Labour Party leader Jeremy Corbyn. Members of the National Union of Journalists formed a guard of honour. McKee's coffin was met with applause from the waiting public as it arrived at the cathedral.

A vigil at the site of her killing held on 19 April was attended by Colum Eastwood, Arlene Foster, Naomi Long and Mary Lou McDonald. A second vigil was held in Belfast City Hall, and was attended by author Anna Burns and John O'Doherty of the Rainbow Project, an LGBT rights charity in Northern Ireland.

Reactions to death
British Prime Minister Theresa May called the murder "shocking and senseless", saying McKee "died doing her job with great courage". Taoiseach Leo Varadkar said "our solidarity also goes out to the people of Derry and to the entire journalism community. We cannot allow those who want to propagate violence, fear and hate to drag us back to the past." Irish President Michael D. Higgins, said "the loss of a journalist at any time in any part of the world is an attack on truth itself."

U.S. House of Representatives Speaker, Nancy Pelosi, who had visited Derry only a few hours before the events, also condemned the murder. The attack was condemned by religious leaders of many denominations, including Ken Good, Church of Ireland Bishop of Derry and Raphoe; Diarmuid Martin, Catholic Archbishop of Dublin; Donal McKeown, Catholic Bishop of Derry; and Charles McMullen, Moderator of the Presbyterian Church in Ireland. Other public figures to express condolences include Karen Bradley, Secretary of State for Northern Ireland; and former US President Bill Clinton. Séamus Dooley, assistant general secretary of the National Union of Journalists in Northern Ireland, described her as "a journalist of courage, style and integrity".

The leaders of Northern Ireland's main political parties, the DUP, Sinn Féin, UUP, SDLP, Alliance Party and Green Party, released a joint statement condemning the killing of McKee and described it as "an attack on all the people of this community, an attack on the peace and democratic processes". They also said that it was a "pointless and futile act to destroy the progress made over the last 20 years, which has the overwhelming support of people everywhere". They further reiterated their support for the Police Service of Northern Ireland, who were the intended targets of the gun attack.

Investigations and prosecutions
The investigative website Bellingcat published an "Open Source Survey" of the shooting. The same day the police had arrested two men, aged 18 and 19, on suspicion of involvement in McKee's murder. They were released without charge the following day. On 23 April, The Irish News published an article claiming that the New IRA had admitted responsibility for the killing, stated that McKee was not the intended target of the murder, and offered apologies to McKee's family and partner. On the same day, police arrested a 57-year-old woman in connection with the murder; she was later released unconditionally.

On 25 April, the crime prevention charity Crimestoppers offered a reward of up to £10,000 for information leading to the conviction of those responsible for the killing. On 1 May the PSNI confirmed it would offer anonymity to any witnesses who came forward with information.

Leona O’Neill, a fellow Derry journalist who witnessed and wrote about McKee's killing, later received online threats, alleging that she was responsible, or had invented her account of the shooting.

On 11 February 2020, four men, aged 20, 27, 29 and 52, were arrested under the Terrorism Act in Derry. A 52-year-old man was charged with McKee's murder the following day. In early June 2020, the murder weapon, a Hämmerli X-Esse .22 LR pistol, was recovered by police from the Ballymagroarty area of Derry. Niall Sheerin, a 28-year-old man from Derry, was subsequently charged with possessing a firearm in suspicious circumstances and possessing a firearm with intent to endanger life; he denied the charges. In a 2021 statement to the Belfast High Court, the prosecution said that the gun had been used in four paramilitary attacks between September 2018 and March 2019. In September 2022, Sheerin was sentenced to seven years in prison for possessing the gun, but not for any involvement in McKee's murder.

On 10 March 2023, two men appeared in court by video, before Mr Justice O'Hara, charged with McKee's murder, with possessing a handgun and ammunition with intent, and with offences connected to the riot, all of which they denied. A full trial is to be held on a date to be fixed.

Media 

McKee, and her friends' attempt to get a conviction after her death, are the subject of a documentary film, The Real Derry Girls, made by Peter Taylor for the BBC.

The film Lyra, by Alison Millar, who was a mentor and friend to McKee, was screened in UK and Irish cinemas in November 2022. It is scheduled to be broadcast on Channel 4 in 2023. It received the Tim Hetherington award at the Sheffield Documentary Festival and the audience award at the Cork Film Festival.

See also
List of journalists killed in Europe

Notes

References

External links 
 The Muckraker – McKee's blog, last updated March 2013
Lyra McKee: How uncomfortable conversations can save lives – TEDx
Journalism and Doing What We Love – Podcast featuring McKee
 We were meant to be the generation that reaped the spoils of peace - the article McKee was working on at the time of her death

1990 births
2019 deaths
British investigative journalists
21st-century women writers from Northern Ireland
Alumni of Birmingham City University
Deaths by firearm in Northern Ireland
Irish investigative journalists
Women journalists from Northern Ireland
Journalists killed in Ireland
Journalists who died as a result of terrorism
LGBT journalists from Northern Ireland
Lesbian writers from Northern Ireland
Murder victims from Northern Ireland
Murdered British journalists
Writers from Derry (city)
Terrorism deaths in Northern Ireland
Terrorist incidents in the United Kingdom in 2019
2010s murders in Northern Ireland
2019 crimes in Ireland
Writers from Belfast
Lesbian journalists
2019 murders in the United Kingdom